Bannockburn House is a property of historical significance in the town of Bannockburn. It is a Category A listed building.

History 
Bannockburn House was built in the late 17th Century, with slight alterations added in the 19th Century. The house was most probably commissioned by Sir Hugh Paterson in 1675, whose son and grandson were made Baronets of that house.

Hugh Paterson, the builder of the house, was a lawyer and a factor for the Earl of Moray. He had coal mines near Bannockburn, managed by William Rob, known as the "coal-grieve". Rob was dismissed for fraud and in 1677 made two attempts to sabotage the works in revenge. The Privy Council ordered the Earl of Mar and Lord Elphinstone to investigate.

In the year of 1746, prior to the Battle of Culloden, Hugh Paterson 2nd Baronet entertained Charles Edward Stuart in Bannockburn House, where he met the Baronet's niece, Clementina Walkinshaw, who would later become his lover and mother of his child. When the house passed to the 2nd Baronet's daughter, Mary, in 1787, she sold the property to William Ramsey of Barnton and Sauchie. The house stayed in the Ramsey Family until it came to Sir James Ramsey Gibson-Maitland, who sold it to Alexander Wilson in 1883. Alexander was a member of the famous Bannockburn weaving family of Wilson. Alexander made many additions and changes to the house, including a new porch entrance and extension to the library and office, and above the main doorway a recess to accommodate a coat of arms which now is empty. 

In 1910 Bannockburn House was sold to the Sheriff Substitute of Stirling at the time, James Mitchell. In 1962 Mitchell's daughter sold the house, after living in it for 32 years. She sold the house to the multi-property owning millionaire A.E Pickard. The house was formerly owned by Peter Drake.
It was placed on the market for sale in February 2016. A local charitable Community Trust was formed to try and purchase the house for the community and for the people of Scotland.  Their aim is to safeguard the property for future generations.  It was announced in April 2017 that the Trust had secured an exclusive right to buy the property and were actively fundraising to raise the required funds. This was achieved in November 2017 with a mixture of public money and grants.

The house and estate have been used as a filming location for Susan Hill's Ghost Story, an adaptation of her novel, The Small Hand, shown on Channel 5 on Boxing Day 2019. The film stars Douglas Henshall and Louise Lombard.

Events
In August 2018 the Trust planned to hold an excavation in the grounds. Dr Murray Cook was due to lead the survey.

Notes and references

External links
"Bannockburn House", Royal Commission on the Ancient and Historical Monuments of Scotland
 Bannockburn House Community buyout website launched in September 2016
 Bannockburn House Documentary  2017 (25 mins) YouTube

Houses in Stirling (council area)